Khlevnoye is a rural locality (a selo) and the administrative center of Khlevensky District, Lipetsk Oblast, Russia. In the 19th century the village was part of Khlevenskaya volost, Zadonsky Uyezd, Voronezh Governorate. Population:

References

Notes

Sources

Rural localities in Lipetsk Oblast